Bandana is the second collaborative studio album by American rapper Freddie Gibbs and record producer Madlib. It was released on June 28, 2019, by ESGN, Keep Cool Records, Madlib Invazion, and RCA Records. Entirely produced by Madlib, it is the follow up to their critically acclaimed 2014 album Piñata, and their sixth project as MadGibbs overall. The album features guest appearances from Pusha T, Killer Mike, Anderson .Paak, Yasiin Bey, and Black Thought.

Background
During Madlib's talk with Red Bull Music Academy on May 7, 2016, he announced that he and Freddie Gibbs will be releasing a second collaborative studio album called Bandana. On May 11, 2019, Freddie Gibbs and Madlib announced that Bandana will be the second installment of a planned trilogy, following Piñata, and that the third project will be called Montana.

Gibbs has described the album as a "manifesto", stating that he wrote the majority of his lyrics while incarcerated and expecting to "go away for ten years". His lyrical content on the album has been described as "veer[ing] between cynicism and empathy".

The day after the album's release, Madlib tweeted that he made all the beats for Bandana on his iPad.

Promotion and release
Gibbs and Madlib released the lead single "Flat Tummy Tea" on February 20, 2019. A titular non-album single, "Bandana" featuring the dancehall artist Assassin, was released on March 5, 2019.

On May 28, 2019, the official album cover was revealed, featuring Madlib's animated alter-ego Quasimoto wearing a bandana around his neck and sitting on a zebra as they watch buildings in Hollywood being set on fire. On May 30, the second single "Crime Pays" was released along with the album's release date being confirmed for June 28.

The third single, "Giannis" featuring rapper Anderson .Paak, was released on June 13, 2019.

Released in December 2019, Freddie Gibbs and Madlib performed a short set for the NPR Tiny Desk series, backed by New York soul band El Michels Affair. The following year, they joined El Michels Affair at their Long Island City studio to record The Diamond Mine Sessions, three new versions of tracks for Amazon Music.

Critical reception

Bandana was met with widespread critical acclaim. At Metacritic, which assigns a normalized rating out of 100 to reviews from professional publications, the album received an average score of 88, based on 23 reviews. Aggregator AnyDecentMusic? gave it 8.1 out of 10, based on their assessment of the critical consensus.

Accompanied by a perfect score, Dean Van Nguyen of The Guardian described the album as "unvarnished and utterly dazzling hip-hop", highlighting Gibbs' performance and the production and direction of Madlib. Thomas Hobbs of NME labelled Bandana the "best rap album of 2019", praising Gibbs' improved lyricism compared to Piñata and Madlib's inventive use of samples: "On Bandana, Gibbs hits another level as a lyricist. He still makes an art out of violent imagery (on the potent "Flat Tummy Tea" he threatens to stab "white Jesus" with a sword), but now has developed much more of a philosophical edge, too. Gibbs' bars, with which he triumphantly talks about going from food stamps to making millions, are inspiring and have a real resilience about them." Hobbs concluded: "The chemistry between Madlib and Gibbs is perfect and there's a timelessness to these songs that will make you think of raw black cinematic worlds such as Super Fly or Truck Turner. Gibbs is basically Isaac Hayes if he could spit a hot 16, his union with Madlib proves opposites really do attract." Christopher Thiessen of Consequence saying "From beginning to end, Bandana is a perfectly-paced album. Madlib never lingers on a single musical idea as he chops samples and switches beats, often midway through songs. Meanwhile, Gibbs, an expert in flows and rhythms, glues each song together with his undaunted, straightforward performances, which offer an illusion of effortlessness".

Kyle Mullin of Exclaim! concluded that Bandana "stands on its own as one of the very best rap albums of 2019, or any other year in recent memory", praising the album's guest appearances and production. Jack Bray of The Line of Best Fit stated: "It is an exceptional modern hip-hop album unafraid of exploring the darker sides of the modern rap persona, all whilst creating a rich, textured sonic environment within which it can be best ingested." Clayton Purdom of The A.V. Club said, "The first record was a grower, gradually establishing itself as one of the great producer-emcee efforts of the young millennium, but Bandana seems designed to dazzle, to assert a joint legacy". Pitchforks critic Stephen Kearse said, "For Bandana, the pair taps into that heritage and allow themselves to be shaped by its highs and lows, its heroes and villains. Finding themselves within that slipstream of black thought and life, they plot their course on their terms. Bandana is tradition and transgression: one rapper, one producer, no limitations".

Rankings

Commercial performance
Bandana debuted on number 21 on the US Billboard 200 and number 13 on the Top R&B/Hip-Hop Albums, with 18,000 album-equivalent units in its first week.

Track listing
All tracks produced by Madlib.

Samples
 "Freestyle Shit" contains a sample from "Elastic Lover", as performed by Revelation Funk.
 "Half Manne Half Cocaine" contains samples of "Gregorian", written and performed by Frank Dukes; "Dust a Sound Boy", written by Denzie Beagle, Winston Riley, and Wilbert Williams, as performed by Super Beagle; and "Graveyard Ismael", written by Dominique Di Rienzo, as performed by Alpha Centori.
 "Crime Pays" contains a sample from "Free Spirit", written by Mary Ellen Haberman and Steve Haberman, as performed by Walt Barr.
 "Massage Seats" contains a sample from "Dance Hall Pt. 1", as performed by Tenor Saw.
 "Palmolive" and "Fake Names" contain a sample from "Cry of a Dreamer", written by Leon Sylvers III, as performed by The Sylvers.
 "Flat Tummy Tea" contains a portion of the composition "Orbit", written by Kaidi Tatham, as performed by Agent K; contains samples from "Love Theme from The Godfather", as performed by Professionals; and "Different Strokes", as performed by Syl Johnson.
 "Giannis" contains samples from "Aasman Ke Neeche", written by S. D. Burman and Majrooh Sultanpuri, as performed by Lata Mangeshkar and Kishore Kumar; and "Say It Loud – I'm Black and I'm Proud", written by James Brown and Alfred James Ellis, as performed by James Brown.
 "Practice" contains a sample from "Make It on Your Own", written and performed by Donny Hathaway.
 "Cataracts" contains a sample from "Teach Me How", written by Norman Whiteside, as performed by Wee.
 "Education" contains a sample from "Mukti Music", written and performed by R. D. Burman.
 "Soul Right" contains a sample from "Noises and Conversations", written by Malcolm Catto, Jake Ferguson, and Mike Burnham, as performed by The Heliocentrics.

Charts

References 

2019 albums
Collaborative albums
Madlib albums
Freddie Gibbs albums
Albums produced by Madlib